Steve Yeager (born 1948) is an independent filmmaker from Baltimore, Maryland, U.S. He is best known for his film on the indie filmmaking of fellow director John Waters, titled Divine Trash, which won the Filmmakers Trophy for Best Documentary at the Sundance Film Festival in 1998.

Career overview
Steve Yeager got his start as a resident director at the Corner Theatre ETC, an experimental theatre company in Baltimore, Maryland (a branch of Ellen Stewart's New York-based Cafe La Mama ETC), with such productions as Pigeons by Lee Dorsey and Marguerite by C. Richard Gillespie. Yeager also directed an original play entitled Chiaroscuro while working at Corner. It was during this period that Steve Yeager also had occasion to work with two emerging talents of the day: Howard Rollins, in a 1972 production of John Steinbeck's Of Mice and Men; and Kathleen Turner, who appeared in Yeager's highly regarded original adaptation  of Robert Louis Stevenson's Dr. Jekyll & Mr. Hyde in 1978. After 1982, Yeager devoted his talents primarily to filmmaking endeavors. In 1985, he won the Grand Prize for Best Documentary at the Houston International Film Festival for Aquarium, a ten-minute film on the National Aquarium in Baltimore.

In 1990, Yeager released his first feature film drama, On The Block. The film offered a gritty look at life in and around The Block, Baltimore's infamous red-light district, and featured an appearance by Howard Rollins in a key role, as well as a cameo by burlesque legend Blaze Starr.

Steve Yeager's 1998 documentary film Divine Trash examines the global underground film movement, and features previously unreleased footage of John Waters' early life and behind-the-scenes capers of his Dreamland crew, including Divine, the 300-pound transvestite Glenn Milstead.  Those interviewed about the making of Pink Flamingos and the context in which it emerged include actors, critics and Baltimore's film industry people of the era. Yeager's sequel to Divine Trash, In Bad Taste, a documentary on Waters' post-Pink Flamingos career, aired in January 2000 on the Independent Film Channel. Yeager played the role of a reporter in both Pink Flamingos and Polyester.

In 2009, Steve Yeager finished work on a new narrative feature film Crystal Fog, which offers a glimpse into relationships within the gay community. The film drew its inspiration, however loosely based,from the life of Yeager's younger brother, who had died approximately twelve years earlier. The film was shot in and around Baltimore during the summer of 2008, and had its initial cast and crew screening in Baltimore in June, 2009. In 2010, Yeager began filming "The Rosens", a narrative feature film detailing the betrayal of family values between three brothers after the death of the family matriarch.

Throughout his work in film, Steve Yeager has continued to direct for the stage, generally in Washington, D.C. and Baltimore. Notable productions include Streamers by David Rabe, S.L.A.G. by David Hare, A View From The Bridge by Arthur Miller, and Michael V. Gazzo's A Hatful of Rain, voted one of the Ten Best Theatre productions of 2008 by the Baltimore City Paper.

Young Filmmakers Workshop
In 2002, Yeager co-founded, along with Lane Keller, the Young Filmmakers Workshop (YFW),  an organization designed to provide young people between the ages of 10–17 an opportunity to realize their dreams of becoming filmmakers, actors, and artisans through the creation of both narrative and documentary motion pictures. The resulting works are ultimately screened at a local art deco movie palace in an event that includes a red carpet premiere and awards.

Other projects
In September, 2006 Yeager directed Suzanne Shepherd - A Gift of Fire, a documentary film about acclaimed New York City actor, director, and teacher Suzanne Shepherd, whose notable and varied roles include Tony Soprano's mother-in-law on the series The Sopranos, as well as featured appearances in Goodfellas, Lolita, Uncle Buck, Living Out Loud, and John Waters' A Dirty Shame.

An unfinished Yeager work, Beyond the Bridge, a biographical film about Howard Rollins, debuted at Baltimore's Senator Theater in 2007.

Yeager is co-author of a book about Divine, called My Son Divine, written with Glenn Milstead's mother Frances.  He teaches film and acting-related courses at Towson University and at the University of Maryland, Baltimore County.

Filmography

References

External links

"The Corner Theatre as a Cultural Oasis: Or will Yosemite Sam Find Happiness In The Vast Sahara Desert?"
A Gift of Fire - Official Website

1948 births
Artists from Baltimore
Film directors from Maryland
Living people
Towson University alumni
Towson University faculty
University of Maryland, Baltimore County faculty